Mayestik Market is a modern traditional market at Kebayoran Baru, in Jakarta, Indonesia.
Drugs and cosmetics, jewelry, clothing and tailors, vegetables and fruits, meat and fish, book store, sports equipment, almost everything needed for daily life are available in this market.

History
This market was present since the 1950s, though it was officially inaugurated in 1981. While the Kebayoran Baru area began to be built in the late 1940s as one of the new satellites in Jakarta, the Mayestik area was the location of the halls of residence.  A row of neat houses, shady trees, beautiful surroundings neatly arranged. If it was once on the edge, now Kebayoran Baru.

In 2010, renovation of the market started and on June 16, 2012, was inaugurated by then Governor of DKI Jakarta Fauzi Bowo.

Facilities
The main building is located in the middle of the area of a 10-story building and is also surrounded by many ruko (shop houses). The market has 2,279 stalls. It is equipped with AirConditioner (AC), standard fire protection equipment, escalator, elevator, sound system, CCTV security, alarm systems, parking facilities, toilets and places of worship., as well as free WiFi service.

Pasar Mayestik is famous for textiles. Everything related to fabrics, costume making, crafting, and sewing supplies (buttons, zippers, ribbons, and appliqués) are available in this market. There are also a number of textile shops owned by Indian Indonesians. Floor arrangement of the market is as follows,
Basement floor: vegetables, ready-to-use spice, meat & poultry, bakery goods, food stalls, plastics, and household stuffs 
Semi-basement floor: glassware, plastic ware, beauty products and tools, shoes, sandals, ready-to-use jamu (Indonesian traditional herbal drink), handicrafts 
Ground floor: ready made garments, textiles 
Mezzanine floor: curtain kiosks, Batik, fabrics 
1st floor: Jewelry 
2nd floor: tailor kiosks, sequins, embroideries, advertising plaques 
P1 floor: food court 
P2 floor: marketing office 
P3 floor: management office 
P4 floor: mosque

Transportation
Pasar Mayestik is located on Jalan Tebah, Kebayoran Baru, South Jakarta, near Pertamina Central Hospital and Taman Puring flea market. It can be reached by TransJakarta Corridor 13, also by Kopaja 605, and MetroMini S78 buses.

References

South Jakarta
Shopping districts and streets in Indonesia
Tourist attractions in Jakarta